D'Angelo Leuila (born 18 January 1997) is a Samoan rugby union player who plays for  in the Bunnings NPC. His playing position is fly-half or fullback. He was named in the  squad that would go on to win the 2021 Bunnings NPC. Leuila is a Samoa international, having made his debut in 2016 against Georgia.

Reference list

External links
 

1997 births
Samoan rugby union players
Samoa international rugby union players
Living people
Rugby union fly-halves
Rugby union fullbacks
Auckland rugby union players
Waikato rugby union players
Moana Pasifika players